Himalafurca is a small genus of south Asian sheet weavers. It was first described by A. V. Tanasevitch in 2021, and it has only been found in Nepal.  it contains only two species: H. martensi and H. schawalleri.

See also
 List of Linyphiidae species (A–H)

References

Linyphiidae genera
Arthropods of Nepal